The Drăghici is a left tributary of the Râul Târgului in Romania. It flows into the Râul Târgului in Mihăești.

References

Rivers of Romania
Rivers of Argeș County